Greg Grossman is an American Chef and Entrepreneur. He is the President and Founder of Kettlebell Kitchen, a "healthy meal and personalized Nutrition delivery service".

Prior to founding Kettlebell Kitchen and VYNElife, Grossman's Company, Culinaria Group, developed and launched the Food Service at the V Hotel in Palm Springs California, operated Beautique Southampton, as well as several Fast Casual Chains in the New York Market.

Biography
Grossman attended New York University but dropped out to spend more time running his business.  At 13, he was a sous chef at Alinea.  He was 21 when he bought Oreya and was their executive chef.

References

Living people
People from East Hampton (town), New York
American restaurateurs
American male chefs
1995 births
New York University alumni